Spencer Bayles is the front-man and songwriter for Leeds, England-based acoustic band Last Night's TV. He once was the famous Guinness world record holder for having the longest appendix ever removed, at a staggering 21 cm (8.26 inches) long.  The record is currently held by Safranco August [26 cm (10.24 in)] in 2006 during an autopsy.

See also 
 Appendicitis
 Appendicectomy

References

External links 
Full details of Spencer Bayles' appendix

Living people
Year of birth missing (living people)